Carpenter Island is a man-made, backward letter L-shaped island and boat launch area on the Columbia River in the U.S. state of Washington. It lies on the Chelan County side of the river, across from Douglas County and is just downstream of Wells Dam. 

Carpenter Island is also known as Carpenter Island Boat Launch. It has a fish hatchery channel which is part of the Wells Dam and Hatchery. It is owned and operated by Douglas County Public Utility District.

References

External links
Map: 

Buildings and structures in Chelan County, Washington
Columbia River
Buildings and structures in Douglas County, Washington